Spy in the Sky! is a 1958 American-British spy thriller film directed by W. Lee Wilder and starring Steve Brodie, Andrea Domburg and George Coulouris.

The film is based on the 1954 novel Counterspy Express by Albert Sidney Fleischman. It was shot at the Cinetone Studios in Amsterdam and on location in Vienna.

Synopsis
A German scientist who knows the secrets of the Sputnik rocket programme goes on the run from the Soviets.

Cast
 Steve Brodie as Vic Cabot
 Sandra Francis as Eve Brandisi
 Andrea Domburg as Alexandrine Duvivier
 George Coulouris as Col. Benedict
 Bob De Lange as Sidney Jardine
 Hans Tiemeijer as Dr. Fritz Keller, alias Hans Krauss
 Herbert Curiel as Pepi Vidor 
 Dity Oorthuis as Fritzi
 Albert E. Gollin as Martin, consul's representative
 Leon Dorian as Agent Max Maxwell
 Roland Wagter as Soldier 
 Monica Witkowna as Gypsy Singer
 Harold Horsten as	Pawnbroker

References

Bibliography
 Goble, Alan. The Complete Index to Literary Sources in Film. Walter de Gruyter, 1999.
 Pomerance, Murray (ed.) American Cinema of the 1950s: Themes and Variations. Rutgers University Press, 2005.
 Warren, Bill. Keep Watching the Skies!: American Science Fiction Movies of the Fifties, The 21st Century Edition. McFarland, 2017.

External links
 

1958 films
1950s thriller films
American spy thriller films
British spy thriller films
Films directed by W. Lee Wilder
Allied Artists films
Films shot in Amsterdam
Films shot in Vienna
Films based on American novels
1950s English-language films
1950s American films
1950s British films